Hawkins House, later known as Sierra Nevada Museum of Art, is a historic home in Reno, Nevada.  It was designed in a  colonial revival style by Elmer Grey for Prince A. Hawkins, a scion of the well-established Hawkins family, in 1911. It is now the offices of the Nevada Interscholastic Activities Association (NIAA).

It is adjacent to the Francis G. Newlands House, a National Historic Landmark.

From 1978 to 1988, the building housed the Sierra Nevada Museum of Art, now known as the Nevada Museum of Art.

References

External links

Houses completed in 1911
Colonial Revival architecture in Nevada
Houses on the National Register of Historic Places in Nevada
Houses in Reno, Nevada
Elmer Grey buildings
National Register of Historic Places in Reno, Nevada